Xitle ( Nahuatl, "navel") is a monogenetic volcano in the Ajusco range in Cumbres del Ajusco National Park. It is located in the Tlalpan borough in the southwestern part of Mexico City. It is an ash cone volcano with a conical form, round base, altitude of approximately 300m, and a slope between 30° and 40°.

Xitle erupted during the period AD 245-315, according to the results of radiocarbon dating. Among the consequences of this eruption were the formation of the Pedregal de San Ángel lava fields, to the south of the Mexican Federal District. Cuicuilco, one of the most refined cities of Mesoamerica, was destroyed and covered by lava. The subsequent diaspora of the Cuicuilcans, and the attendant diffusion of their culture across most of central Mexico, influenced important cultural changes in the nearby power center of Teotihuacan.

According to some other sources, a series of big volcano eruptions, and the destruction of Cuicuilco took place in the 1st century BC.

See also
Sierra de Ajusco-Chichinauhtzin

References

This article draws heavily on the corresponding article in the Spanish-language Wikipedia, which was accessed in the version of 11 June 2006.

Landforms of Mexico City
Volcanoes of Mexico City